The Danco Coast is the portion of the west coast of the Antarctic Peninsula between Cape Sterneck and Cape Renard. This coast was explored in January and February 1898 by the Belgian Antarctic Expedition under Adrien de Gerlache, who named it for Lieutenant Emile Danco who died on the expedition.

The coast is bordered by the Aguirre Passage which separates it from Lemaire Island.

Places on the Danco Coast
 Brabazon Point
 Salvesen Cove

Geology
The Danco Coast Tectonic Block includes the Upper Permian-Triassic Trinity Peninsula Group, consisting of over 1000 m of metaturbidites folded during the Gondwanide orogeny.  This group is overlain by the Lower Cretaceous Antarctic Peninsula Volcanic Group, with up to 2000 m of basaltic and andesitic lavas, tuffs and agglomerates, which were folded and faulted during the Tertiary.  These two groups were intruded by the Berriasian-Cenomanian granite and gabbro sills of the Andean Instrusive Suite.  A system of hypabbysal dykes intruded during the Late Cretaceous or Tertiary.

See also
Gerlache Strait Geology
Mount Frödin

Further reading 
 R. Casaux, M. L. Bertolin, A. Carlini, Feeding habits of three seal species at the Danco Coast,Antarctica: a re-assessment, Polar Biol (2011) 34:1615–1620, DOI 10.1007/s00300-011-0994-1

References
 

 
Coasts of Graham Land